ITPS may refer to:

International Test Pilots School
Institute of Thomas Paine Studies
Ib Thermal Power Station
 Intergovernmental Technical Panel on Soils, for soil governance
 Institute of Technical and Professional Studies, at the Dedan Kimathi University of Technology

See also 
 ITP (disambiguation)